Sector 236 – Thor's Wrath is a 2010 Swedish horror science fiction film. It was produced by Swedish stuntman Lars Lundgren who also was the main stunt coordinator. Lundgren had previously worked as a stuntman in films such as Planet of the Apes and Thriller - A Cruel Picture.

Plot
A platoon of Swedish Mountain Rangers goes missing in the remote military sector 236 - nicknamed since the Viking age Thor's Wrath. The Swedish government sends captain Palmquist and a special force to investigate. Joining them is the American agent and scientist Johnson. Meanwhile, a group of teenagers goes to hike in the area. Their phones suddenly lose reception and the compass stops working. Soon, they are killed off one by one by an unseen force. At the headquarters, the Swedish Colonel Stag realises that the American has lied about what he believes to hide in sector 236. He sets out to save his soldiers from walking into a bloodbath.

Cast

References

External links
 
 

2010 films
2010 horror films
2010s science fiction horror films
Swedish science fiction horror films
2010s Swedish-language films
2010s Swedish films